Kürecik may refer to:

Kürecik, also known as Kepez, part of Akçadağ district in Turkey's Malatya Province
Kürecik Radar Station, NATO base in Turkey